Black is a 2017 fantasy-thriller South Korean television series starring Song Seung-heon, Go Ara, Lee El, and Kim Dong-jun. It aired from October 14 to December 10, 2017 on OCN's Saturdays and Sundays at 22:20 (KST) time slot.

Synopsis
Black is the story of a grim reaper who is forced to track down his fugitive partner. In the process, he uncovers the truth about a series of cold case murders from 20 years ago. Investigating the murders complicates the reaper's primary role of guiding the deceased to their respective afterlife, especially after he falls in love with a mortal woman - which leads him to break supernatural rules against involvement in human affairs.

Cast

Main
 Song Seung-heon as Han Moo-gang / Black (Grim Reaper #444) / Kim Joon
 Choi Seung-hoon as young Han Moo-gang
 Han Moo-Gang newly joins the detective team of the Regional Crime Unit in order to find out the truth of a case that happened 20 years before. After his death, he is possessed by the messenger of hell, No.444. When Han Moo-Gang dies unexpectedly, the bracelet Kang Ha-ram gave to Kim Joon appears on his hand, so Kang Ha-ram mistakes him for her childhood first love, "Joon Oppa".
 Go Ara as Kang Ha-ram
 Ok Ye-rin as child Kang Ha-ram
 Choi Myung-bin as young Kang Ha-ram
 A woman who can foresee death as a dark shadow looming over someone which turns out to be a grim reaper following them to their moment of death.
 Lee El as Yoon Soo-wan
 Song Soo-hyun as young Yoon Soo-wan
 A doctor who is in love with Han Moo-gang. She was adopted by Kim Joon's family decades prior to the main storyline, and was the victim of several filmed sexual assaults by the perpetrators of the serial murders. Her real name is Kim Sun-young.
 Kim Dong-jun as Oh Man-soo
 Lee Seung-woo as child Oh Man-soo
 Lee Geon-ha as young Oh Man-soo
 A second generation chaebol.

Supporting

People around Han Moo-gang
 Kim Won-hae as Na Gwang-gyun / Crazy Dog
 Jung Suk-yong as Bong Man-shik
 Lee Chul-min as Oh Soo-tae
 Huh Jae-ho as Park Gwi-nam
 Ji Su-won as Seo Young-hwa, Han Moo-gang's mother and Kim Joon's adoptive mother who is a cardiologist.

People around Kang Ha-ram
 Kim Jung-young as Choi Soon-jung, Ha-ram's mother.
 Lee Si-won as young Choi Soon-jung
 Kim Hyung-min as Kang Soo-hyuk, Ha-ram's father.
 Go Seung-bo as Hoon-seok, Ha-ram's stepbrother.
 Park Jung-hak as Ha-ram's stepfather

Grim Reapers
 Kim Tae-Woo as Grim Reaper #444
 Park Doo-shik as Je Soo-dong / Grim Reaper #419
 Jo Jae-yoon as Grim Reaper #007
 Lee Kyu-bok as Grim Reaper #416
 Jung Joon-won as Jang Hyun-soo / Grim Reaper #416 (real form), a friend of Kim Joon who was killed in the Mujin Time Mart incident.

People around Man-soo
 Lee Do-kyung as Oh Chun-soo, Man-soo's father.
 Choi Min-chul as Oh Man-ho, Man-soo's half-brother.
 Choi Won-hong as Oh Sang-min, Man-ho's son.
 Kim Jae-young as Leo / Kim Woo-shik, a K-pop star
 Jeon Jin-seo as young Kim Woo-shik
 Oh Cho-hee as Tiffany / Lee Young-hee
 Kim Young-sun as Man-soo's mother

Others
 Lee Hae-young as Min Jae-hong
 Woo Hyun as Wang Yong-chun, a man with spider tattoo.
 Kim Bo-yoon as Soo-jin
 Lee Kwan-hoon as Chen (man with missing finger)
 Bae Jung-hwa as Han Jin-sook
 Lee Hyo-je as Kim Joon / Han Moo-chan, Han Moo-gang's older brother who is renamed as Han Moo-chan after being adopted by Moo-gang's mother.
 No Tae-yeop as Steven Yoo
 Lee Joon-seo as Park Seung-chul
 Song Min-hyung as Woo Byung-sik
 Cha Chung-hwa as Clara
 Yeon Jae-wook as Lee Byung-tae

Production
 The script reading of the cast was held on July 24, 2017.
 The series was under negotiation with Netflix for a simultaneous streaming deal, and it is currently available on the streaming service.

Original soundtrack

Part 1

Part 2

Part 3

Ratings

Remake
The series was adapted into a Malay-language web series  which was released on Viu for two seasons. The Malaysian adaptation replaced the concept of grim reaper with Orang bunian, a supernatural being in Malay folklore.

References

External links
  
 Black at Studio Dragon 
 Black at iWill Media 
 
 

OCN television dramas
Television series by Studio Dragon
Television series by IWill Media
2017 South Korean television series debuts
2017 South Korean television series endings
South Korean thriller television series
South Korean fantasy television series
South Korean romance television series
Korean-language Netflix exclusive international distribution programming